The Stadium Arcadium World Tour (also known as The Intergalactic Tour) was a 2006–2007 concert tour by the band Red Hot Chili Peppers in support of their ninth studio album, Stadium Arcadium. The band started out with a pre-tour promotional leg of dates around the world while the world tour was composed of six legs, three in Europe, one in Australia, New Zealand and Asia, and the other two in the US and Canada.

The tour was the last to feature guitarist John Frusciante until 2022's  Global Stadium Tour. Frusciante confirmed his departure from the band in 2009 but rejoined in 2019. Frusciante was replaced in the band by longtime friend and musical partner, Josh Klinghoffer, who was a backing musician for the Peppers in 2007 on the final legs of the Stadium Arcadium tour, serving as an additional guitarist, backing vocalist, and performing keyboard parts. Adding an extra guitarist for the first time to their touring lineup gave the band a chance to perform songs that they were otherwise unable to play with just one guitarist.

Songs performed

Tour dates

Reschedules on March 19(Osaka), 22 and 23(Tokyo) because of Anthony Kiedis' pneumonia.

North American leg I
The first North American leg grossed 25.6 million dollars in ticket sales.

North American leg II

Boxscore

Opening acts

The Mars Volta
Gnarls Barkley
Dizzee Rascal
Ben Harper and the Innocent Criminals
Dinosaur Jr.
Jet
My Chemical Romance
Kasabian

The Missingmen
Mickey Avalon
!!!
Dirty Pretty Things
Har Mar Superstar
Chuck Dukowski Sextet
Soweto Gospel Choir
Biffy Clyro
Reverend and the Makers
Patti Smith and The Meters also joined the band onstage to cover their own songs.

Tour overview
Most shows started with an opening jam by John Frusciante and the band before the signature riff of "Can't Stop" signalled Anthony Kiedis' arrival on stage. The rest of the songs changed with each venue; however, "Charlie" and "Dani California" were usually played as the second or third songs. The set list consisted mainly of songs from the new album, Stadium Arcadium and the previous two albums, By the Way and Californication. Singles such as "Tell Me Baby", "Snow ((Hey Oh))" and "Hump de Bump" were core numbers. The band also incorporated several acoustic numbers from the recent release and the back catalogue, which gave the show both a fast and slow pace. Some of the band's more popular singles that were played often on the previous tours such as "Around The World", "Parallel Universe" and "Suck My Kiss" were rarely played. The encore of the show usually consisted of "Californication" along with a classic Red Hot Chili Peppers anthem, such as "Give It Away" or "Higher Ground", one of the band's more popular songs from the 1980s which was added to the setlist on the tour's final legs and performed for the first time since the Californication tour. "Higher Ground" was one of only two songs from Mother's Milk played on the entire tour with the other being "Nobody Weird Like Me". The band also played "Funky Monks" twice on this tour, their first and last performance leading this tour was in 1991. Two songs from Freaky Styley, "Catholic School Girls Rule" and "Sex Rap" were performed for the first time in over 15 years. The tour also marked the first time since 1991 that two of the Peppers' biggest and best known singles, "Give It Away" and "Under the Bridge", were not included in all performances leaving some fans at certain shows upset that one if not both of the songs were left out of the setlist. Of the album's 28 songs and 10 B-sides, only 20 songs have been played live in any capacity, none of which were B-sides, and "Hard to Concentrate" was not played live until the band's I'm With You tour.

This tour marked the last time "21st Century", "Catholic School Girls Rule", "C'mon Girl", "Desecration Smile", "Funky Monks", "Havana Affair", "Readymade", "Sex Rap", "So Much I", "Stadium Arcadium", "This Velvet Glove", "Torture Me" and "Warlocks" were played live.

Personnel
Flea – bass, backing vocals, trumpet, keyboards
John Frusciante – guitar, backing vocals
Anthony Kiedis – lead vocals
Chad Smith – drums

Additional musicians
Josh Klinghoffer – guitar, backing vocals, keyboard, percussion (2007)
Marcel Rodriguez-Lopez – keyboards, clavinet, percussion (2006–January 2007)
Chris Warren – keyboards, backing vocals on Catholic School Girls Rule (2007)

Notes

External links
Red Hot Chili Peppers website
The Side: Red Hot Chili Peppers Touring History

Red Hot Chili Peppers concert tours
2006 concert tours
2007 concert tours